The Perkins Homestead, also known as the Brick House, is a historic homestead at 478 River Road in Newcastle, Maine.  The  property, including its 1837 brick farmhouse, was designated a National Historic Landmark for its association with the life of Frances Perkins (1880–1965), the first woman to hold a position in the United States Cabinet.  Perkins spent many years, both as a child and later as an adult, at this property, which she considered to be her true home.  The property was first listed on the National Register of Historic Places in 2009 as the Brick House Historic District in part for its archaeological significance.

Description and history
The roughly rectangular property slopes from the road down to the Damariscotta River, which like the road runs generally north–south. The westernmost part of the property includes all of its buildings, a walled garden, and a tract of historic farmland just north of the building complex. The central portion of the property is forested, with paths lined by stone walls leading to agricultural fields in the plain adjacent to the river. The easternmost area, in addition to these agricultural fields, includes the remains of several other Perkins family residences, and the remains of a brickmaking operation. This area also includes the archaeological remains of an 18th-century garrison house. The homestead complex consists of a brick two-story house, built in 1837, which is connected by a series of additions to a barn that was originally freestanding. A short way east of the barn is a small late-19th century outbuilding, which has seen a variety of uses, including as a chicken house and art studio.

The property has been owned by the Perkins family for more than 250 years.  When Frances Perkins was a child, she often spent summers with her grandmother on the property, and was her home in the later years of her life.  She and members of her immediate family are buried in the family cemetery, which is on the property.  Perkins, born in 1880, was educated at Mount Holyoke College, and was working as a social worker in New York City when the Triangle Shirtwaist Factory fire occurred in 1911.  Perkins' profile was raised by her leadership in advocating for changes to fire codes in the aftermath of the blaze, which killed 146 workers.  Perkins was appointed Secretary of Labor by President Franklin Delano Roosevelt in 1932, a time when the country was suffering great unemployment in the Great Depression.  Perkins was responsible for seeing through legislative enactment of significant labor reforms, including the 40-hour work week, bans on child labor, and unemployment and worker compensation programs.

Perkins regularly spent summers at the Maine homestead, and inherited it with her sister in 1927.  She was its primary resident and caretaker until her death in 1965.  The property was first listed on the National Register of Historic Places for its pre-20th century historical and archaeological importance in 2009, and was designated a National Historic Landmark for its association with Perkins in 2014.  The property is still owned by the Perkins family, and is occasionally open to the public for tours organized by the Damariscotta-based Frances Perkins Center.

See also
List of National Historic Landmarks in Maine
National Register of Historic Places listings in Lincoln County, Maine

References

External links
Frances Perkins Center page on touring the property

Houses on the National Register of Historic Places in Maine
Houses in Lincoln County, Maine
Houses completed in 1837
National Historic Landmarks in Maine
National Register of Historic Places in Lincoln County, Maine
Buildings and structures in Newcastle, Maine
1837 establishments in Maine